Odontomera is a genus of flies in the family Richardiidae. There are about 19 described species in Odontomera.

Species
These 19 species belong to the genus Odontomera:

O. albopilosa Hendel, 1911 c g
O. apicalis Hendel, 1911 c g
O. basistriga (Walker, 1861) c g
O. canonigra Enderlein, 1912 c g
O. cincta Hennig, 1938 c g
O. coniceps Hendel, 1911 c g
O. costalis Hendel, 1911 c g
O. ferruginea Macquart, 1843 i c g b
O. flavipennis Enderlein, 1912 c g
O. flavipleura Hennig, 1938 c g
O. limbata Steyskal, 1958 i c g b
O. liturata Robineau-Desvoidy, 1830 c g
O. marginalis (Walker, 1861) c g
O. nigropilosa Hendel, 1911 c g
O. nitens (Schiner, 1868) c g
O. ruficauda Hendel, 1936 c g
O. strigata Hennig, 1938 c g
O. terminalis (Walker, 1853) c g
O. venosa Hendel, 1911 c g

Data sources: i = ITIS, c = Catalogue of Life, g = GBIF, b = Bugguide.net

References

Further reading

 

Tephritoidea genera
Articles created by Qbugbot
Taxa named by Pierre-Justin-Marie Macquart